= Stand Up Before Me, Oh My Soul! =

Studio album by Fabio Orsi
- Released: January 18, 2011
- Recorded: 2009–10
- Studio: Taranto, Italy; Berlin, Germany
- Genre: Drone; punk rock; space rock; art rock
- Length: 45:43
- Label: Preservation
- Producer: Fabio Orsi

Fabio Orsi chronology
Winterreise (2010)	Stand Up Before Me, Oh My Soul! (2011)

Stand Up Before Me, Oh My Soul! is a studio album recorded and performed by Italian musician Fabio Orsi in 2009 and 2010 and released on January 18, 2011 by the Italian label Preservation.

== Composition ==
Preservation's press release for Stand Up Before Me, Oh My Soul! describes the record as a "pursuit of pure dissonant bliss," where it has a combination of a bright, gorgeous tone and a harsh, dark feel. There are many ways in which the album deviates from his past works; it is a hazy-sounding punk rock album whose "raw and primal pulse at [its] heart" is very prevalent, its instrumentation consisting of very-heavily distorted electric guitars and bombastic drums performed by Rich Baker. Allmusic additionally categorized Stand Up Before Me, Oh My Soul! as a space rock and post-rock album. The tracks of Stand Up Before Me, Oh My Soul! vary in style, from the kraut-rock track "Papa, Show Me Your Blues LPs" to the electro-noise on "My Awesome Drugs Propaganda."

All of the songs on Stand Up Before Me, Oh My Soul! follow a controlled structure which involves a central drone building into biggers and then moving into silence. In describing the characters of the album, Collin Anderson of Tiny Mix Tapes wrote that the drums are only a "sibilant, shapeshifting, suppurating thing, continuous even as they threatened to dislodge all spatial continuity." The musical instruments are "defamiliarized familiarities that materialize[] like overly-sympathetic resonances," who react to the thing by mourning and celebrating it. Ondarock described the tracks as paths to extraterrestrial, alien planets that really turn out to be "human, all too human."

== Critical reception ==
Professional ratings
Review scores
Source	Rating
AllMusic	3.5/5 stars
Ondarock	6.5/10

Ondarock described Stand Up Before Me, Oh My Soul! as "unfinished, but always very lively." Michael Ardaiolo, writing a review for Dusted magazine, wrote that the album has "eyebrow-raising moments" that "are worth the listening investment, but it’s not one that will appreciate significantly over time." He felt the rock sound of the LP was unfitting with its type of composition: "The songs can begin to feel like noisy guitar versions of an electronica track. And there is a discernable lack of fluidity to some of the tracks that would aid the energy Orsi is trying to lasso."

Stand Up Before Me, Oh My Soul! landed at number 41 on a year-end list of the best releases of 2011 by Tiny Mix Tapes, where Anderson praised the LP's use of varying instruments: "These were the coyest beckoners of divergent traditions, these made the album worthy of its histrionic name, these, crucially, were just under-the-skin enough to sell Orsi’s abstraction as a personal statement."

== Track listing ==
Stand Before Me, Oh My Soul!
No.	Title	Length
1.	"Naked Trance"	6:14
2.	"Folks! My Soul Stands Up Before You!"	2:37
3.	"Papa, Show Me Your Blues LPs"	3:24
4.	"Full Metal Flat"	4:53
5.	"My Awesome Drugs Propaganda"	6:57
6.	"Please Could You Hide That Ghost Noise?"	7:41
7.	"Ghost Track"	3:24
8.	"Soon, I'll Be at Home"	10:33
Total length:		45:43

== Personnel ==
The following information adapted from the liner notes of Stand Before Me, Oh My Soul!:

- Written, recorded and produced by Fabio Orsi in Taranto, Italy and Berlin, Germany in 2009–2010
- Mastered by Orsi and Gianluca Becuzzi
- Cover design by Mark Gowing
- Drums loop by Rich Baker

== Release history ==
Region	Date	Format(s)	Label
Worldwide	January 18, 2011	CD; Digital download; streaming; Vinyl	Preservation
